Carrousel international du film de Rimouski is a children's film festival taking place each year in Rimouski, Quebec. The jury is composed of children from various countries.

External links 
 Carrousel international du film de Rimouski (in French)

Film festivals in Quebec
Culture of Rimouski
Children's film festivals in Canada
Tourist attractions in Bas-Saint-Laurent